Oumed Oukri (Amharic: ዑመድ ዑክሪ; born 5 October 1990), also spelt as Oumed Oukuri or Omod Okwury, is an Ethiopian professional footballer who plays as a forward for Oman Professional League club Suwaiq.

Club career
Oumed was born in Gambela National Regional state, one of the federal regions of Ethiopia, which is located in the south western part of Ethiopia near to the border of Sudan.
Oumed has scored three goals for his club, Defence Force in six Ethiopian premier league games that club played this year 2010 (2003 Ethiopian calendar). He is becoming the rising star in the domestic games. Oumed Oukri has been named the Best Sportsman according to the weekly Capital Ethiopia's Top 30 List for the 2003 Ethiopian Calendar.
In the summer of 2012, Oumed was transferred to reigning premier league champions, Saint George. He scored his first official goal, on 17 October 2012, in a penalty-shootout loss against arch-rivals Ethiopian Coffee. His goalscoring attracted attention of some Egyptian clubs, but St. George declined to release him. In spite of all this, he continued to play well and shared the title of league champions with his team in the 2013–14 season. Consequently, the Ethiopian champions allowed him move to a foreign league.

On 21 May 2014, Oumed signed a three-year deal with the Egyptian side Al Ittihad. However, he transferred to ENPPI in 2015, then he played for El Entag El Harby and Smouha SC. On 16 September 2019, Oumed joined Aswan SC.

International career
Oumed made a debut for Ethiopia on 30 November 2009, in a match against Djibouti, and he immediately scored two goals. The final result was 5–0 for Ethiopia. His third goal came in an African cup qualifiers against Guinea, in September 2010.

Oumed also scored two goals against Malawi and Zambia and two goals against Uganda in the 2010 CECAFA Cup tournament, held in Dar es Salaam, Tanzania.

In January 2014, coach Sewnet Bishaw, invited him to be a part of the Ethiopia squad for the 2014 African Nations Championship. The team was eliminated in the group stages after losing to Congo, Libya and Ghana.

Career statistics
Scores and results list Ethiopia's goal tally first, score column indicates score after each Oukri goal.

References

External links
 
 

1990 births
Living people
Sportspeople from Gambela Region
Ethiopian footballers
Association football forwards
Ethiopia international footballers
2013 Africa Cup of Nations players
Egyptian Premier League players
Saint George S.C. players
Al Ittihad Alexandria Club players
ENPPI SC players
El Entag El Harby SC players
Smouha SC players
Aswan SC players
Hadiya Hossana F.C. players
Ethiopian expatriate footballers
Ethiopian expatriate sportspeople in Egypt
Expatriate footballers in Egypt
Ethiopia A' international footballers